The Victoria River is a river in the Victoria Bonaparte bioregion of the Northern Territory, Australia.

Location and features

Part of the area adjoining the river mouth has been identified as the Legune (Joseph Bonaparte Bay) Important Bird Area because of its importance for waterbirds.

However, the longest permanent river in the Northern Territory, as defined by international standards, is the Katherine/Daly River. This is a single river with two separating (at the Flora River tributary) European names. This great river was, until recently, deemed as two separate rivers due to the European naming conventions of the time. Its journey begins just south of Jabiru, high in the Arnhem Land escarpment as a trickle until it flows into the Timor Sea some  later, thus making it  longer than the Victoria River.

The river has 56 tributaries including the Camfield River, Wickham River, Battle Creek, Angalarri River, Gidyea Creek and Armstrong River. The river also flows through several waterholes such as Catfish waterhole and Four Mile Waterhole.

Important wetlands are found in the lower reaches of the river with forming suitable habitat for waterfowl breeding colonies and roosting sites for migratory shorebirds. Large areas of rice-grass floodplain grasslands are also found along the river.

Several large cattle stations are found along the length of the river including Riveren where the river originates, Victoria River Downs, Wave Hill Station and Coolibah Station.

History

In August 1855 Augustus Gregory sailed from Moreton Bay and at the end of September reached the estuary of the Victoria River. He sailed up the river and carried out extensive exploration.

In 1847 Edmund Kennedy went on an expedition to trace the route of the "River Victoria" of Thomas Mitchell with a view to finding whether
there was a practical route to the Gulf of Carpentaria. This "River Victoria" was later renamed the Barcoo River.

Eponyms
A species of turtle, Emydura victoriae, is named after the Victoria River.

See also

List of rivers of the Northern Territory

References

Rivers of the Northern Territory